Laima is the largest producer of confectionery in Latvia. Its named after Laima, the goddess of fate in Latvian mythology and headquartered in Riga.

History 
The company traces its origins to the 19th century when the Theodor Riegert company was one of the largest confectioners in the Baltic Provinces of the Russian Empire. Despite the loss of Russian markets, the company maintained its major market position domestically following Latvia's independence in 1918. 

The current company name was adopted in 1925 after a merger with two brothers Eliyahu and Leonid Fromenchenko (also spelled Fromchenko). In 1933, after the two Russian Jews sold the company, Eliyahu Fromchenko founded Elite in Israel at Ramat Gan.

During both the 1930s and Soviet period in Latvia, Laima was the main chocolatier in Latvia, with L.W. Goegginger (later renamed Uzvara by the Soviets) being the main producer of hard candies.

After Latvia regained its independence in the 1990s, Laima amalgamated with both Uzvara and cookie, wafer, and cake manufacturer Staburadze to become a single company under the Laima name.

Corporate affairs 
Unlike similar regional producers of national brands, such as Lithuania's Karūna, Sweden's Marabou, and Norway's Freia, Laima wasn't bought out by an international player like Kraft Foods. Ownership of Laima is controlled by Nordic Food, owned by local businessman Daumants Vītols. After introducing Laima shares to the Riga Stock Exchange in December 2006, the controlling owners decided to once again make the company private, taking it off the market on 13 July 2007. The parent company of Laima was acquired by Orkla Group in August 2014.

Brand recognition 

The product in Laima's current range with the longest history is the chocolate candy Serenāde, the recipe for which has remained unchanged since 1937.

In Riga, one of the major landmarks is the Laima Clock, near the Freedom Monument. This is a classic meeting place for people in Riga.

As a publicity gesture, in 2007 Laima gave the inhabitants of Ruhnu island in the Gulf of Riga a 40 kg statue of a bear made of chocolate, to commemorate a brown bear that had swum over, presumably from the Latvian mainland, to the Estonian island.

See also 
 List of bean-to-bar chocolate manufacturers

References

External links 
  (in Latvian, Russian and English)
 Images of Laima wrapper designs throughout the decades

Brand name confectionery
Soviet brands
Latvian brands
Food and drink companies of the Soviet Union
Manufacturing companies based in Riga
Companies established in 1870
Chocolate companies
1870 establishments in Europe
Food and drink companies established in 1870
Companies nationalised by the Soviet Union